Barbara Reid Bass (born January 29, 1954) is the immediate past mayor of Tyler, Texas. First elected in May 2008, she won re-election in 2010 and 2012. She left office in 2014 because of term limits and was succeeded by Martin Heines, a real estate businessman.

Service 
Bass has served as chair of the Better Business Bureau of Central East Texas, and the Tyler Area Chamber of Commerce, the Tyler Economic Development Council. Bass also served as chairman of the Hospice of East Texas and as treasurer of the East Texas Symphony Orchestra Association. For two decades, she has served on the Texas Society of CPAs, including three terms on the executive board. She was a Leadership Tyler Class I participant. To succeed Mayor Joey Seeber, Bass defeated Laura Corbett in 2008 to become Tyler's first female mayor.

She donated money to Louie Gohmert.

Personal life 
Bass is a native East Texan and moved to Tyler with her husband, Billy, in 1977. She is a partner in the CPA firm, Gollob Morgan Peddy PC. She is the treasurer of Pollard United Methodist Church.

References 

1954 births
Living people
Mayors of places in Texas
Women mayors of places in Texas
People from Tyler, Texas
Texas Republicans
Businesspeople from Texas
American United Methodists
21st-century American women